The Cook County State's Attorney functions as the state of Illinois's district attorney for Cook County, Illinois, and heads the second-largest prosecutor's office in the United States. The office has over 700 attorneys and 1,100 employees. In addition to direct criminal prosecution, the State's Attorney's Office files legal actions to enforce child support orders, protect consumers and the elderly from exploitation, and assist thousands of victims of domestic violence every year.

Subdivisions of the State's Attorney's office
The Criminal Prosecutions Bureau is the largest bureau in the office. The bureau is divided into three divisions: Felony Trial, Sexual Crimes, and Municipal. Each division is further divided into specialized units located throughout the county. The bureau is also charged with prosecuting thousands of domestic violence cases each year as well as cases of child sexual abuse through the Child Advocacy Division.

The Juvenile Justice Bureau contains two divisions: Delinquency and Child Protection. The Delinquency Division handles cases involving juveniles who have been charged with committing misdemeanors or felonies. The Child Protection Division files civil actions against parents and guardians who abuse or neglect their children.

The Narcotics Bureau consists of the following units: Preliminary Hearings/Grand Jury, Felony Trial, Narcotics Courtrooms, Drug Treatment Programs, Complex Narcotics Prosecution, and Asset Forfeitures.

The Special Prosecutions Bureau is responsible for investigating and prosecuting complex criminal and public corruption cases. It includes units for Auto Theft, Gang Crimes, Government and Financial Crimes, Organized Crime/Cold Case, and Professional Standards. It also initiates civil and criminal lawsuits to protect individuals and the general public interest. Consumer Fraud and Seniors and Persons with Disabilities are also units in the bureau.

The Civil Actions Bureau defends the county and its officeholders and employees in civil suits, provides a full range of legal services for all county agencies, and represents the county's interests in actions brought to collect monies owed for taxes and fees. The bureau has sections dedicated to Child Support Services, Complex Litigation, Labor and Employment, Civil Rights/Torts, Workers' Compensation, Municipal Litigation (including Transactions/Health Law), and Real Estate Tax Litigation.

The Investigations and Administrative Services Bureaus supply investigative, technical and administrative assistance to the office. The Administrative Services Bureau supports all the other bureaus with administrative personnel and contains the office's national award-winning Victim Witness Assistance Program that provides services to crime victims.

Appearance in fiction
A fictionalized version of the office is a major backdrop in the TV series The Good Wife and the Chicago franchise.

List of Cook County State's Attorneys

Election results

|-
| colspan=16 style="text-align:center;" |Cook County State's Attorney general elections
|-
!Year
!Winning candidate
!Party
!Vote (pct)
!Opponent
!Party
! Vote (pct)
!Opponent
!Party
! Vote (pct)
!Opponent
!Party
! Vote (pct)
!Opponent
!Party
! Vote (pct)
|-
|1912
| | Maclay Hoyne
| | Democratic
| | 122,419 (27.85%)
| | Lewis Rinaker	
| | Republican
| | 113,181 (25.74%)
| | William A. Cunnea
| | Socialist
| | 107,647 (24.49%)
| | George I. Haight
| | Progressive
| | 93,495 (21.27%)
| | John H. Hill
| | Prohibition
| | 2,895 (0.66%)
|-
|1916
| | Maclay Hoyne
| | Democratic
| | 236,384 (44.57%)
| | Harry B. Miller	
| | Republican
| | 191,456 (36.10%)
| | William A. Cunnea
| | Socialist
| | 102,579 (19.34%)
|
|
|
|
|
|
|-
|1920
| | Robert E. Crowe
| | Republican
| | 525,115 (58.44%)
| | Michael L. Igoe
| | Democratic
| | 319,236 (35.53%)
| | William A. Cunnea
| | Socialist
| | 50,766 (5.65%)
| | John C. Teevan
| | Farmer-Labor
| | 3,463 (0.39%)
|
|
|
|-
| 1924…1968
| colspan=15 | 
|-
|1972
| | Bernard Carey
| | Republican
| | 
| | Edward Hanrahan
| | Democratic
| | 
|
|
|
|
|
|
|
|
|
|-
|1976
| | Bernard Carey
| | Republican
| | 
| | Edward J. Egan
| | Democratic
| | 
|
|
|
|
|
|
|
|
|
|-
|1980
| | Richard M. Daley
| | Democratic
| | 1,058,529 (50.39%)
| | Bernard Carey
| | Republican
| | 1,042,287 (49.61%)
| 
| 
| 
| 
| 
|
|
|
| 
|-
|1984
| | Richard M. Daley
| | Democratic
| | 1,418,775 (65.98%)
| | Richard J. Brzeczek
| | Republican
| | 731,634	(34.02%)
| 
| 
| 
| 
| 
| 
|
|
|
|-
|1988
| | Richard M. Daley
| | Democratic
| | 1,303,906 (66.70%)
| | Terrance W. Gainer
| | Republican
| | 650,942	(33.30%)
| 
| 
| 
| 
| 
|
|
|
| 
|-
|1990
| | Jack O'Malley
| | Republican
| | 692,192 (52.96%)
| | Cecil A. Partee
| | Democratic
| | 511,424 (39.13%)
|Text style="background:#D2B48C | Janice H. Robinson
|Text style="background:#D2B48C | Harold Washington Party
|Text style="background:#D2B48C | 103,353 (7.91%)
| 
| 
|
|
|
| 
|-
|1992
| | Jack O'Malley
| | Republican
| | 1,272,939 (61.27%)
| | Patrick J. O'Connor
| | Democratic
| | 804,528 (38.73%)
|
|
|
|
|
|
| 
| 
| 
|-
|1996
| | Richard A. Devine
| | Democratic
| | 805,659 (47.88%)
| | Jack O'Malley
| | Republican
| | 694,306 (41.26%)
| R. Eugene Pincham
| Justice Party 
| 156,695 (9.31%)
|Text style="background:#D2B48C | Lawrence C. Redman, Jr.
|Text style="background:#D2B48C | Harold Washington Party
|Text style="background:#D2B48C | 26,131 (1.55%)
|
|
|
|-
|2000
| | Richard A. Devine
| | Democratic
| | 1,337,578 (78.30%)
| | David P. Gaughan
| | Republican
| | 370,678 (21.70%)
| 
| 
| 
| 
| 
|
|
|
| 
|-
|2004
| | Richard A. Devine
| | Democratic
| | 1,483,280 (79.43%)
| | Philip Spiwak
| | Republican
| | 384,082 (20.57%)
| 
| 
| 
| 
|
|
|
| 
| 
|-
|2008
| | Anita Alvarez
| | Democratic
| | 1,378,452 (69.90%)
| | Tony Peraica
| | Republican
| | 494,611 (25.08%)
| | Thomas O'Brien
| | Green
| | 99,101 (5.03%)
| 
| 
| 
|
|
|
|-
|2012
| | Anita Alvarez
| | Democratic
| | 1,427,145 (77.05%)
| | Lori S. Yokoyama
| | Republican
| | 421,810 (22.77%)
| 
| 
| 
| 
|
|
|
| 
| 
|-
|2016
| | Kim Foxx
| | Democratic
| | 1,459,087 (72.06%)
| | Christopher E.K. Pfannkuche
| | Republican
| | 565,671 (27.94%)
| 
| 
| 
|
|
|
| 
| 
| 
|-
|2020
| | Kim Foxx
| | Democratic
| | 1,194,299 (54.21%)
| | Pat O'Brien
| | Republican
| | 861,108	(39.08%)
| | Brian Dennehy
| | Libertarian
| | 147,769 (6.71%)
|
|
| 
| 
| 
|

See also
 Circuit Court of Cook County
 Cook County Sheriff's Office

References

External links
 Official website

Government of Cook County, Illinois
State attorneys
District attorneys in Illinois